David Whiteman may refer to:

David Andrew Patrick Whiteman, Canadian musician and songwriter
David Bruce Whiteman (born 1952), Canadian American poet, translator, and essayist

See also
David Wightman (disambiguation)